The Thirty-ninth Amendment of the Constitution of Ireland is a planned amendment to the Constitution of Ireland to enshrine gender equality in the document.

The Taoiseach Leo Varadkar marked International Women's Day (8 March 2023) by announcing the Government's intention to hold a referendum in November to enshrine gender equality in the Constitution by amending Articles 40 and 41. Other referenda on separate issues may be held at the same time.

Proposals for constitutional amendments will be published by the end of June with a referendum to follow in November.

References

External links
 Referendum Commission official website
 Referendum Returning Officer official website

2023 in Irish law
2023 in Irish politics
2023 referendums
39
39
Amendment, 39